Albert "Al" Nelson (born October 27, 1943) is a former professional American football cornerback in the National Football League (NFL) for nine seasons for the Philadelphia Eagles. He played college football at the University of Cincinnati and was drafted in the third round of the 1965 NFL Draft. Nelson was also selected in the ninth round of the 1965 AFL Draft by the Buffalo Bills.

On September 26, 1971, in the first Eagles game at the newly-opened Veterans Stadium, Nelson scored a fourth quarter touchdown on a then-record 102-yard return of a missed field goal by Dallas Cowboys kicker Mike Clark. It was the Eagles' only score of the contest in a lopsided 42-7 loss. The previous holder of the record was his coach at the time Jerry Williams. In the previous off-season, the league had allowed missed field goals kicked into the end zone to be returned.

He is also a member of the Beta Eta chapter of Kappa Alpha Psi fraternity.

References

1943 births
Living people
Players of American football from Ohio
American football cornerbacks
Cincinnati Bearcats football players
Philadelphia Eagles players